Van-e Olya (also Romanized as Vān-e ‘Olyā; also known as Vān and Vān-e Bālā) is a village in Ojarud-e Sharqi Rural District, Muran District, Germi County, Ardabil Province, Iran. At the 2006 census, its population was 97, in 23 families.

References 

Towns and villages in Germi County